is a Japanese former swimmer who competed in the 1988 Summer Olympics.

References

1974 births
Living people
Japanese female backstroke swimmers
Japanese female medley swimmers
Olympic swimmers of Japan
Swimmers at the 1988 Summer Olympics
Universiade medalists in swimming
Universiade silver medalists for Japan
20th-century Japanese women
21st-century Japanese women